Sondern is a village and subdistrict of Halver, in Märkischer Kreis district, North Rhine-Westphalia, Germany. First mentioned in 1480, it is situated north of the state road L284, not far from the settlements of Kückelhausen, Auf der Brake, Schlade and Ehberg.

References

Villages in North Rhine-Westphalia
Märkischer Kreis